Carrick, Cumnock and Doon Valley, may refer to:

Carrick, Cumnock and Doon Valley (Scottish Parliament constituency)
Carrick, Cumnock and Doon Valley (UK Parliament constituency)